Pa Yin Yaung is a 1969 Burmese black-and-white drama film, directed by Khin Soe starring Kawleikgyin Ne Win, Daisy Kyaw Win, May Thit and Kyauk Lone.

Cast
Kawleikgyin Ne Win as Ba Khet
Daisy Kyaw Win as Htway Yee, Hla Hla (dual role)
May Thit as Daw May Thit
Kyauk Lone as Kyauk Lone
Gyan Sein as Daw Saw
Jolly Swe as Jolly

Award

References

1969 films
1960s Burmese-language films
Films shot in Myanmar
Burmese black-and-white films
1969 drama films
Burmese drama films